Jinx is the first novel (2013) in a middle-grades children's fantasy trilogy by Sage Blackwood, published by HarperCollins. Set in a sentient primeval forest called The Urwald, the novel follows the adventures of a boy named Jinx who is abandoned in the forest and rescued by the wizard Simon Magus. Jinx grows up in Simon's house. After the wizard does a spell on Jinx that causes him to lose his ability to see others' emotions, Jinx runs away to seek help from the evil Bonemaster.

The second and third books in the trilogy are Jinx's Magic (2014) and Jinx's Fire (2015).

A separate Blackwood fantasy for middle-grade readers, Miss Ellicott's School for the Magically Minded, was published by HarperCollins in 2017.

Reception
According to The New York Times, Jinx is magical and brilliant, a world wonderfully imagined, with "scenes that delight, enchant and thrill.". The book was selected as a Best Book of 2013 by Kirkus Reviews, School Library Journal, Booklist, the Chicago Public Library, and Amazon.

The Guardian reviewer, ChristopherW wrote of Jinx's Magic, "I hate starting a series part way through, but the author did a good job of filling me in with the story so far. I'm going to read the first book in the series very soon. I'd recommend this to fans of anything magical!"

Of Jinx's Fire, Kirkus Reviews said, "A solid conclusion to a trilogy ... threaded with proper amounts of heroism, humor and ingenious twists of character."

Jinx was among the purchases made by President Obama for his daughters, at a D.C. area independent bookstore on the 2013 Thanksgiving weekend Small Business Saturday.

Other Books
As Karen Schwabach, the author has four middle-grades historical novels published by Penguin Random House:
A Pickpocket's Tale (2008), recipient of the 2002 manuscript Sidney Taylor Book Award;
The Hope Chest (2010);
The Storm Before Atlanta (2011);
Starting From Seneca Falls (2020);
and earlier nonfiction geocultural/social studies books for middle grades curriculum, including:
Thailand: Land of Smiles, Dillon Press (Minneapolis, MN), 1991.
El Salvador on the Road to Peace, Dillon Press (Minneapolis, MN), 1999.

She holds a Master of Science degree from SUNY at Albany, in English as a second or foreign language, and for some years administered an ESL program in Alaska, later teaching in the education department at Salem College in North Carolina.

References

2013 American novels
American children's novels
American fantasy novels
Children's fantasy novels
2013 children's books
HarperCollins books